The following is the result of the World Weightlifting Championships tournaments in year 1905.

Tournament 1
The first tournament (6th World Weightlifting Championships) was held in Berlin, Germany from April 8 to April 10, 1905. There were 41 men in action from 4 nations.

Tournament 2
The second tournament (7th World Weightlifting Championships) was held in Duisburg, Germany from June 11 to June 13, 1905. There were 7 men in action from 2 nations.

Tournament 3
The third tournament (8th World Weightlifting Championships) was held in Paris, France from December 16 to December 30, 1905. There were 16 men in action all from France.

Medal table

References
Results
Weightlifting World Championships Seniors Statistics

External links
International Weightlifting Federation

World Weightlifting Championships
World Weightlifting Championships
World Weightlifting Championships
World Weightlifting Championships
International weightlifting competitions hosted by France
International weightlifting competitions hosted by Germany